The elephant trunk snake or the Javan file snake (Acrochordus javanicus), is a species of snake in the family Acrochordidae, a family which represents a group of primitive non-venomous aquatic snakes.

Description
The elephant trunk snake possesses a wide and flat head, and its nostrils are situated on the top of the snout. Those head particularities confer to A. javanicus a certain resemblance with boas. However, its head is only as wide as its body. The dorsal side of the snake's body is brown, and its ventral side is pale yellow.

The skin is baggy and loose giving the impression that it is too big for the animal. The skin is covered with small rough adjacent scales. The skin is also used in the tannery industry.

The top of the head has no large shields, but instead is covered with very small granular scales. There are no ventral scales. The body scales are in about 120 rows around the body. The body is stout, and the tail is short and prehensile.

The elephant trunk snake is fully adapted to live underwater so much that its body cannot support its weight out of water and leaving the water can cause it serious injury.

Reproduction
An aquatic snake, the elephant trunk snake is ovoviviparous, with the incubation lasting 5 to 6 months and the female expelling 6 to 17 young.

Geographic range
The elephant trunk snake is found in South-East Asia west of the Wallace Line: southern Thailand, the west coast of Peninsular Malaysia, Singapore, Borneo (Kalimantan, Sarawak), a number of Indonesian islands (Java, Sumatra, and (possibly) Bali); possibly also in Cambodia and Vietnam, although the last is discredited by the IUCN.

Habitat
The elephant trunk snake has a coastal living habitat like rivers, estuaries and lagoons. But it prefers freshwater and brackish environments.

Feeding
The elephant trunk snake is an ambush predator that preys on fishes and amphibians. It usually catches its prey by folding its body firmly around the prey. Its loose, baggy skin and its sharp scales find their utility by limiting any risk of escape of the prey, in particular fishes which have bodies covered with a viscous, protective mucus.

Behaviour
The elephant trunk snake is nocturnal. It spends most of its life under water and rarely goes on land. It can stay under water for up to 40 minutes.

Original publication
Hornstedt CF (1787). "Beskrifning på en Ny Orm från Java ". Kongl. Vetenskaps Akademiens Handlingar 4: 306-308 + Plate XII. (Acrochordus javanicus, new species). (in Latin and Swedish).

References

External links
http://www.marinespecies.org/aphia.php?p=taxdetails&id=344014
https://www.ncbi.nlm.nih.gov/Taxonomy/Browser/wwwtax.cgi?lin=s&p=has_linkout&id=39267
Javan Filesnakes at Life is Short but Snakes are Long

Further reading
Smith MA (1943). The Fauna of British India, Ceylon and Burma, Including the Whole of the Indo-Chinese Sub-region. Reptilia and Amphibia. Vol. III.—Serpentes. London: Secretary of State for India. (Taylor and Francis, printers). xii + 583 pp. (Acrochordus javanicus, pp. 132–134, Figure 43).

Acrochordidae
Reptiles described in 1787
Snakes of Indonesia
Snakes of Malaysia
Snakes of Singapore
Snakes of Thailand
Reptiles of Borneo